Pata Negra is a Spanish flamenco-blues band, established by brothers Raimundo Amador (singer and guitarist, b. 1959 in Seville) and Rafael Amador (guitarist and cantaor, b. 1960 in Seville) after the breakup of their previous band Veneno. Their style of derivative rhythms based on flamenco nuevo and blues, which they titled "blueslería", made an impact on other modern flamenco music bands. The Amador brothers as Pata Negra, recorded five records between 1978 and 1989.

Discography
Albums
"Pata Negra" 1981
"Rock Gitano I" 1982
"Guitarras callejeras" 1985
"Blues de la Frontera" 1986
"Inspiración y locura" 1990
"El directo" (Live) 1994
"Como una vara verde" 1994

Other compilations
"Rock Gitano" (Nuevas mezclas)
"Best of Pata Negra", 1998
"Pata Negra" 2002

Flamenco groups
Spanish musical groups
New flamenco